Clark Montgomery (born May 20, 1981) is an American Olympic eventing rider. He competed at the 2016 Summer Olympics in Rio de Janeiro, but did not finish the individual competition as he retired during the cross-country stage.

References

External links
 

Living people
1981 births
American male equestrians
Equestrians at the 2016 Summer Olympics
Olympic equestrians of the United States